Francie Swift is an American actress best known for her role as Cynthia in Thoroughbreds and her recurring roles as Haylie Grimes on Outsiders and Anne Vanderbilt Archibald on Gossip Girl.

Life and career
Swift was born in Amarillo, Texas. She began acting as a child at the Amarillo Theatre School for Children. Prior to her senior year in high school, Swift left Amarillo to attend the Interlochen Center for the Arts in Michigan. Swift then attended State University of New York at Purchase, then settled in New York City.

Swift had roles in several plays from 1997 to 2002. In 1997, Swift starred alongside Amy Ryan and Peter Dinklage in Marking, a black comedy by Patrick Breen. In 1998, Swift had a leading role in Whale Music, a play by Anthony Minghella. In 2000, Swift starred in Tooth, a theater production in New York. In 2002, she starred in Richard Greenberg's play, The Dazzle, alongside Peter Frechette.

On Gossip Girl, Swift had a recurring role as Anne Vanderbilt Archibald, the mother of Nate Archibald. From 2010-2011, Swift played Sherrie West, an assistant district attorney on Law & Order: Special Victims Unit. She had a recurring role as Haylie Grimes in the Outsiders. In 2017, Swift played Cynthia in Thoroughbreds, which was played at Sundance Film Festival.

Personal life
Swift lives in New York City with her husband, Brad Blumenfeld, and their two sons.

Filmography

Film

Television

References

External links

American film actresses
American television actresses
Living people
Place of birth missing (living people)
Year of birth missing (living people)
20th-century American actresses
21st-century American actresses
People from Amarillo, Texas